Benjamin Allen Kruse (born April 18, 1978) is an American politician and a former member of the Minnesota Senate who represented District 47, which included portions of Anoka and Hennepin counties in the northern Twin Cities metropolitan area. A Republican, he is a real estate agent with Coldwell Banker Burnet, based in Minnesota.

Kruse was first elected in 2010. He was a member of the Commerce and Consumer Protection, the Education, the Local Government and Elections, and the Transportation committees. His special legislative concerns were commerce, education, taxes, and public safety. Kruse was defeated in his 2012 bid for re-election, losing to John Hoffman.

Kruse was born and raised in Green Bay, Wisconsin, and moved to Minnesota to attend the University of Minnesota in Minneapolis. He eventually left college to work as a restaurant manager, and later became a real estate agent. He also worked for a time as a legislative assistant to State Representative Bob Gunther, who represents District 24A in the southern part of the state.

Active in his local business community, Kruse is a founding member of the North Hennepin Area Chamber of Commerce Government Relations Committee, and has been a member of the Minnesota Association of Realtors Government Affairs Committee, the Minneapolis Area Association of Realtors Public Affairs Task Force and Government Affairs Committee, the North Hennepin Area Chamber of Commerce, and the Coldwell Banker Burnet Presidents Advisory Council.

References

External links

Senator Benjamin Kruse Web Page
Project Vote Smart - Senator Benjamin Kruse Profile
Benjamin Kruse Campaign Web Site

1978 births
Living people
People from Brooklyn Park, Minnesota
Politicians from Green Bay, Wisconsin
American real estate brokers
University of Minnesota alumni
Republican Party Minnesota state senators
21st-century American politicians